The Beethoven Prize of the city of Bonn was an international composition competition. In 1959 Bonn's Lord Mayor Wilhelm Daniels announced the establishment of a Beethoven prize for "the best orchestral work of a young composer". No restrictions were made to genre, style and instrumentation of the composition. The prize was given every 3 years, the prize money was 25,000DM (1961: biennially, 5,000DM). The prize was last awarded in 1992. Other Beethoven Prizes existed in Vienna and Berlin.

Recipients 
 1961 Heimo Erbse for Pavimento, op. 19, for large orchestra
 1963 Milko Kelemen for Transfiguration for piano and orchestra
 1967 György Ligeti for Requiem
 1970 Klaus Huber for Tenebrae
 1974 Bruno Maderna for Aura for orchestra (posthum), Peter Michael Hamel for Dharana, Chris Hinze for Live Music Now
 1977 Iannis Xenakis for Erikhthon for orchestra, Pauline Oliveros for Bonn Fire, Pierre Mariétan for Opus Wassermusik, Luftklang, Straßenmusik
 1980 Wolfgang Rihm for Jacob Lenz, Aleksander Lasón for Symphonie concertante for piano and orchestra, Reinhard Febel for Charivari for ensemble
 1983 Manuel Hildalgo for Hacia (string quartet), Manfred Stahnke for Penthesilea (3rd string quartet), Joachim Krebs for Quartettomanie (2nd string quartet)
 1986 Jörg Birkenkötter for Sechs Stücke für Kammerensemble, Michael Jarell for Trei II for soprano and five instruments, Konstantinos Varotsis for "Schillern" ("Iridescences")
 1989 Bernd Jestl for Der König stirbt (opera), Hermann Spree for Aufregungszustand am Nachmittag (chamber opera)
 1992 Paul Roberts for Align II for Saxophon-Trio and Piano

References

German music awards
Classical music awards
Ludwig van Beethoven
Awards established in 1959
1959 establishments in West Germany